This list comprises all players who have participated in at least one league match for the New York Red Bulls (formerly known as the MetroStars) since the team's first Major League Soccer season in 1996. Players who were on the roster but never played a first team game are not listed; players who appeared for the team in other competitions (US Open Cup, CONCACAF Champions League, etc.) but never actually made an MLS appearance are noted at the bottom of the page.

A "†" denotes players who only appeared in a single match.

A
  Anatole Abang
  Tyler Adams 
  Joe Addo
  Jeff Agoos
  Juan Agudelo
  Andre Akpan
  Nelson Akwari
  Chris Albright
  Eric Alexander
  Brandon Allen †
  Jozy Altidore
  Byron Alvarez
  Pedro Álvarez
  Mike Ammann
  Juan Pablo Ángel
  Kenny Arena
  Armando
  Jhonny Arteaga
  Stéphane Auvray

B
  Gideon Baah
  Nidal Baba
  Marcelo Balboa †
  Mehdi Ballouchy
  Danny Barber †
  Brandon Barklage
  Shaun Bartlett
  Edgar Bartolomeu
  Mersim Beskovic
  Brian Bliss
  Tenywa Bonseu
  Danleigh Borman
  Jonathan Borrajo †
  Ruben Bover
  Andrew Boyens
  Michael Bradley
  Branco
  Chris Brauchle
  Pablo Brenes
  Edson Buddle
  Michael Bustamante
  Michael Butler †

C
  Sal Caccavale †
  Tim Cahill
  Blake Camp
  Peter Canero
  Nicola Caricola
  David Carney
  Albert Celades
  Danny Cepero
  Conor Chinn
  Ian Christianson
  Ted Chronopoulos
  Mark Chung
  Gabriel Cichero
  Jordan Cila
  Ricardo Clark
  Braeden Cloutier
  Aurélien Collin
  Alex Comas
  Wilman Conde
  Bobby Convey
  Jon Conway
  Kenny Cooper
  Ramiro Corrales
  Bouna Coundoul
  Saša Ćurčić

D
  Omer Damari
  Austin da Luz
  Cristian da Silva
  Nino Da Silva
  Brad Davis
  Sean Davis
  Antony de Ávila
  Dwayne De Rosario
  John DeBrito
  Mamadou Diallo
  Joey DiGiamarino
  Birahim Diop
  Youri Djorkaeff
  Francis Doe
  Roberto Donadoni
  Thomas Dooley
  Paul Dougherty
  Alec Dufty †
  Mike Duhaney
  Todd Dunivant
  Chris Duvall

E
  Gerson Echeverry †
  Oscar Echeverry
  Richard Eckersley
  Fabián Espíndola
  Derrick Etienne

F
  Rodrigo Faria
  Felipe
  Fernando Fernandes †
  Gilberto Flores
  Juan Forchetti
  Sam Forko
  Hunter Freeman

G
  José Galván
  Sergio Galván Rey
  Walter García †
  Bill Gaudette
  Eddie Gaven
  Ted Gillen
  Gilmar
  Cornell Glen
  Kevin Goldthwaite
  Julian Gómez
  Paul Grafer
  Taylor Graham
  Mike Grella
  Winston Griffiths
  Amado Guevara
  Guido

H
  Jeremy Hall
  Rhett Harty
  Chris Henderson
  Ezra Hendrickson
  Ian Hennessy
  Thierry Henry
  Daniel Hernández
  Jason Hernandez
  Rubén Darío Hernández
  Corey Hertzog
  Ken Hesse †
  Markus Holgersson
  Alex Horwath †
  Tim Howard
  Eduardo Hurtado
  Mirsad Huseinovic †

I
  Abbe Ibrahim
  Salou Ibrahim
  Elie Ikangu

J
  Diego Jiménez
  Carlos Johnson
  Rob Johnson
  Steve Jolley
  Mike Jones †
  Miles Joseph
  Juninho
  Andrzej Juskowiak

K
  Nansha Kalonji
  Brian Kamler
  Macoumba Kandji
  Matt Kassel
  Stephen Keel
  Brian Kelly
  Louis Ken-Kwofie †
  Kosuke Kimura
  Mohammad Khakpour
  Martin Klinger
  Sacha Kljestan
  Kevin Knight
  Matt Knowles
  Chris Konopka †
  Dema Kovalenko
  Leonard Krupnik
  Eric Kvello
  Mickey Kydes

L
  Connor Lade
  Manny Lagos
  Alexi Lalas
  Jerrod Laventure
  Kemar Lawrence
  Sébastien Le Toux
  Jacob LeBlanc
  Carlos Ledesma †
  Chris Leitch
  Stan Lembryk †
  Andrew Lewis
  Darin Lewis
  Joel Lindpere
  Mark Lisi
  Aaron Long
  Brent Longenecker
  Lawrence Lozzano
  João Luiz
  Péguy Luyindula

M
  Mike Magee
  Rafael Márquez
  Josué Martínez †
  Thiago Martins †
  Clint Mathis
  Lothar Matthäus
  Matthew Mbuta
  Dax McCarty
  Ryan Meara
  Chris Megaloudis †
  Carlos Mendes
  Tony Meola
  Matt Miazga
  Roy Miller
  Dahir Mohammed
  Jeff Moore
  Amando Moreno
  Jaime Moreno
  Martin Munnelly †
  Joe Munoz †
  Michael Amir Murillo
  Alex Muyl
  Roy Myers

N
  Omid Namazi †
  Brian Nielsen
  Mike Nugent

O
  Marius Obekop
  Ernst Öbster
  Dominic Oduro
  Jámison Olave
  Danny O'Rourke
  Karl Ouimette
  Ambroise Oyongo

P
  Alfredo Pacheco
  Arley Palacios
  Victor Pálsson
  Jeff Parke
  Carlos Parra
  Ross Paule
  Russell Payne †
  Heath Pearce
  Peguero Jean Philippe
  Orlando Perez
  Damien Perrinelle
  Mike Petke
  Brian Piesner †
  Juan Pietravallo
  Eddie Pope

Q
  Santino Quaranta
  Eric Quill

R
  Tab Ramos
  Ante Razov
  Tim Ream
  Tim Regan
  Andrew Restrepo
  Claudio Reyna
  Dane Richards
  Travis Rinker
  Marco Rizi †
  Carl Robinson
  Luis Robles
  Luke Rodgers
  Edmundo Rodriguez
  Jorge Rojas
  Jim Rooney
  John Rooney
  Frank Rost
  Daniel Royer
  Tyler Ruthven

S
  Lloyd Sam
  Manolo Sanchez
  Wellington Sánchez †
  Luke Sassano
  Giovanni Savarese
  Markus Schopp
  Ibrahim Sekagya
  Mark Semioli
  Saër Sène
  Diego Serna
  Steve Shak
  Dustin Sheppard
  Danilo Silva
  Damian Silvera
  Khano Smith
  Jan Gunnar Solli
  Diego Soñora
  Mike Sorber
  Seth Stammler
  Jonny Steele
  Eric Stevenson †
  Ryan Suarez
  Greg Sutton
  Barry Swift

T
  Teemu Tainio
  Carey Talley †
  Fabian Taylor
  Tony Tchani
  Zach Thornton

U
  Siniša Ubiparipović
  Chris Unger

V
  Joselito Vaca
  Adolfo Valencia
  Dave van den Bergh
  Marcelo Vega
  Peter Vermes
  Gonzalo Verón
  Joe Vide
  Petter Villegas

W
  Jonny Walker
  Anthony Wallace
  Billy Walsh
  Tim Ward
  Ronald Waterreus
  Cordt Weinstein
  Zach Wells
  Andy Williams
  Richie Williams
  John Wolyniec
  A. J. Wood
  Bradley Wright-Phillips
  Shaun Wright-Phillips
  Marvell Wynne

Z
  Henry Zambrano
  Jeff Zaun
  Kerry Zavagnin
  Craig Ziadie
  Nick Zimmerman
  Sal Zizzo
  Ronald Zubar

Miscellaneous
  Digão appeared in one MLS Cup playoff match, but never appeared in a regular season match.
  Alex Dixon never played in a league match, but appeared in three Copa Merconorte matches.
  Irving Garcia never appeared in a league match, but appeared in Open Cup matches.
  John Gilkerson never played in a league match, but started for the first 45 minutes of an Open Cup match.
  Šaćir Hot never played in a league match, but appeared in Open Cup matches.
  Andrew Jean-Baptiste never played in a league match, but played 44 minutes as a substitute in an Open Cup match.
  Gordon Kljestan never appeared in a league match, but played 45 minutes as a substitute in an Open Cup match.
  Tyler Lassiter never appeared in a league match, but appeared in Open Cup matches.
  Ryan Maduro never appeared in a league match, but played 2 minutes as a substitute in an Open Cup match.
  Marcos Paullo never appeared in a league match, but appeared in Open Cup matches.
  David Roth never appeared in a league match, but played 27 minutes as a substitute in an Open Cup match.
  Teddy Schneider never played in a league match, but appeared in Open Cup matches.

Sources

 

New York Red Bulls
 
Association football player non-biographical articles